The Rath House is an architecturally significant house located at 2703 West Logan Boulevard in the Logan Square neighborhood of Chicago, Illinois, United States. It was built in 1907 by the architect George W. Maher for John Rath, the owner of the Rath Cooperage Company, one of the largest barrel-making concerns in the country. The house was designated a Chicago Landmark on December 1, 1993.

The Rath House features the low roofline and deep eaves characteristic of many Prairie School dwellings, as well as distinctive entryway and doorway arches and impressive art-glass windows.

References

External links
Logan Square Preservation: History of Logan Square
"George Washington Maher - architect of the Rath House"

Houses completed in 1907
Houses in Chicago
Chicago Landmarks